József Mucha (born 25 October 1951) is a former Hungarian professional footballer who played as a midfielder, later became a football coach. He was a member of the Hungarian national football team.

Career 
He started playing football in his hometown and moved to Dorogi FC, where he continued his career with the local youth team. His talent was quickly noticed by the then coach of the adult team, János Varga, who gave him a chance to play in the senior team at the age of 17, where he played with such renowned teammates as István Ilku, László Csóri, József Bartalos and István Fellegi. He was soon invited to the youth national team when he was discovered by Ferencvárosi TC  and remained loyal to the Green and White for 11 years. Two-time Hungarian champion and four-time Magyar Kupa (MNK) winner. Member of the Ferencvárosi TC team that reached the final of the 1974–75 European Cup Winners' Cup. In 1981, he turned professional for two years with K.S.V. Waregem, Belgium.

National team 
He played 6 times for the national team between 1974 and 1981.

As a coach 
He graduated as a football coach from the University of Physical Education in Budapest. From 1983 he worked as a coach at Ferencvárosi TC. He first worked with the junior team and then as a coach for Tibor Nyilasi. In 1996 and 1999 he was temporarily head coach of the first team on two occasions. Later, his name was mentioned as a possible head coach of Dorogi FC, which did not materialize. He led FC Tiszaújváros and then BFC Siófok for one season each, both in Nemzeti Bajnokság I. Interestingly, on two occasions he led his players against the team from Dorogi FC and both times came out victorious. Firstly, as coach of FC Tiszaújváros in 1998 and then as coach of BFC Siófok in 2001. A special attraction of this match was that Dorogi FC was managed by the same László Strausz, who had been head coach of BFC Siófok a few weeks earlier. He is the appointed national coach of the Hungarian national futsal team and also the coach of the futsal team of the NB I champion Rubeola FC Csömör.

Honours 

 Nemzeti Bajnokság I (NB I)
 Champion: 1975-76, 1980-81
 Magyar Kupa (MNK)
 Winner: 1972, 1974, 1976, 1978

References 

Living people
1951 births
Hungary international footballers
Hungarian footballers
Association football midfielders
Ferencvárosi TC footballers
Ferencvárosi TC managers
Dorogi FC footballers
BFC Siófok managers
K.S.V. Waregem players
Nemzeti Bajnokság I players
Nemzeti Bajnokság I managers